The County of Deas Thompson is a county (a cadastral division) in Queensland, Australia. It is situated between the cities of Gladstone and Rockhampton.  The county is divided into civil  parishes. The county was named for Edward Deas Thomson, a New South Wales politician, but the name was misspelt Thompson when applied to the county.

The county was created on 1 September 1855 by royal proclamation under the Waste Lands Australia Act 1846. On 7 March 1901, the Governor issued a proclamation legally dividing Queensland into counties under the Land Act 1897. Its schedule described Deas Thompson thus:

Parishes
Deas Thompson is divided into parishes, as listed below:

References

External links 

 
 

Deas Thompson